Bourdotigloea is a genus of fungi in the family Phleogenaceae. Basidiocarps (fruit bodies) are effused, waxy, and (microscopically) have unclamped hyphae, conspicuous cystidia, and basidia that are auricularioid (tubular and laterally septate). Some species were formerly referred to Helicogloea, but molecular research, based on cladistic analysis of DNA sequences, has shown that the two genera are distinct. Bourdotigloea currently contains 9 species. The genus is known from Europe and North America.

Species
Bourdotigloea cerea
Bourdotigloea concisa
Bourdotigloea dura
Bourdotigloea grisea
Bourdotigloea lanea
Bourdotigloea longispora
Bourdotigloea multifurcata
Bourdotigloea sebacinoidea

References

Atractiellales
Basidiomycota genera